The New South Wales Police Force (NSW Police Force; previously the New South Wales Police Service and New South Wales Police) is the primary law enforcement agency of the state of New South Wales, Australia. Divided into Police Area Commands (PACs), for metropolitan areas and Police Districts (PDs), for regional and country areas, the NSW Police Force consists of more than 400 Police stations and over 18,000 officers, who are responsible for covering an area of 801,600 square kilometres and a population of more than 8.2 million people.

Under the Police Regulation Act, 1862, the organisation of the NSW Police Force was formally established in the same year with the unification of all existing independent Police units in the state. The authority and responsibility of the entire Police Force were given to the Inspector General of Police.

The NSW Police Force currently operates with a strength of 21,455 employees (17,348 officers and 4,107 support staff), with 432 police stations, 3,300 vehicles, 52 boats, 9 aircraft and a budget of 4.8 billion AUD.

Symbols, mission and authority
The motto of the NSW Police Force is the Latin Culpam poena premit comes ("Punishment follows closely upon the heels of crime"). The NSW Police Force insignia includes the motto.

Its coat of arms features the state badge; a soaring Australian wedge-tailed eagle carrying a scroll with the word Nemesis, the Greek goddess of chastisement and vengeance, and here signifies retribution and justice; a wreath and the St Edward's Crown, the crown of the King as the NSW head of state.

The mission of the NSW Police Force, as set out in the Police Act 1990, is to work with the community to reduce violence, crime and fear.

NSW Police Force aims to protect the community by
 Preventing, detecting and investigating crime
 Monitoring and promoting road safety
 Maintaining social order
 Performing and coordinating search and rescue operations

Police conduct a wide variety of further specialist duties undertaken by Specialist Commands.

Like all other states of Australia, local municipalities in NSW have only very limited law enforcement responsibilities. The police perform the primary law enforcement role in all areas of the state.

History

1788 – Early forms of law enforcement
Law enforcement has existed in various forms since the foundation of the colony of New South Wales at Sydney in 1788. In order to protect the infant town against thieves and petty criminals after dark, Governor Arthur Phillip authorised the formation of a nightwatch in August 1789, consisting of eight of the best-behaved convicts. After his appointment as the new governor of New South Wales, Governor Lachlan Macquarie restructured the police force in January 1811, setting up a basic system of ranks and control and recruiting free men instead of convicts into the force. Police units were under the rule of the District Magistrates.

1825 – NSW Mounted Police
After the conflict in 1824 with the Wiradjuri people around Bathurst and Mudgee, the colonial authorities in New South Wales recognised the need for a mounted force to maintain control on the frontier. As a result, the NSW Mounted Police was formed in the following year. Up until 1850, this force operated as de facto cavalry unit as the troopers were soldiers requisitioned from the British Army. Their main task in this period was to subdue groups of Aboriginals resisting European colonisation and capture bushrangers. From 1850 the Mounted Police took on a more civilian role. In 2009, it had 34 horses and was claimed to be the oldest mounted police unit in the world. Another specialist group formed during this time were the Water Police (formed in 1832).

1839 – Border Police
By this stage, the NSW government could not afford the cost of maintaining the Mounted Police along the expanding frontiers of the colony. A new frontier police consisting of mounted convict troopers, called the Border Police, was therefore established. The convicts assigned were mostly soldiers who had run afoul of the law. The Border Police was funded by a levy placed on the squatters who had brought livestock into the areas beyond the borders of settlement. In addition to controlling the Aboriginal and bushranger threats, the Border Police were also tasked with resolving land disputes with the squatters.

1848 – Native Police
With the end of convict transportation approaching, the Border Police was dissolved and replaced with another low-cost frontier force called the Native Police. This force consisted of Aboriginal troopers under the command of European officers. Exploiting intertribal hostility, the duty of this force was mostly to suppress Aboriginal resistance to European colonisation. From 1859, the responsibility of the Native Police passed from the NSW government to the newly formed Queensland government.

In the early 1850s, Victoria seceded from New South Wales and it created its own force.

1862 – Establishment of the Police Force

As the colony expanded, a more sophisticated form of crime management was called for; this involved unifying all the police units into a single cohesive police force with the centralisation of authority. After a failed attempt made by Act No. 38 of 1850, unified control of the police eventuated in 1862 when the Police Regulation Act (1862) was passed, establishing the New South Wales Police Force. The first Inspector General of Police, John McLerie, was appointed to assume overall authority and responsibility. The Police Regulation (Amendment) Act, passed in 1935, changed the official title to Commissioner of Police, with its role clearly defined. The position of Deputy Commissioner was also created.

By 1872, there were 70 police stations throughout the colony in sub-districts, with a total of 803 police officers. 

In July 1915, the first female police officers commenced duty, being Misses Lilian May Armfield (1884–1971) and Maude Marion Rhodes (–1956). 

In 1961, the year before the centenary of the Police Force, the number of members of the force increased to 5717, which rose to a total strength of 15,354 in November 2008.

Bushrangers
After the formation of the New South Wales Police Force in 1862, most crimes were committed by bushrangers, particularly during the Victorian gold rush years. Constable Byrne almost single-handedly fought off the Ben Hall gang when they attacked a gold escort at Majors Creek on 13 March 1865. Constable O'Grady was taken ill with cholera when, on 9 April 1866, he left his sick-bed to confront the Clarke gang, which was incorrectly renowned as being the "bloodiest bushrangers" of the colony of NSW and of Australia. Constable Walker was one of the earliest Australian-born mounted troopers to gain fame. He brought Captain Thunderbolt's enduring "bushranging" career to an end by shooting him near Uralla in New England, NSW.

Constable Ernest Charles Day (later the Inspector General of Police) showed courage under fire when he shot and captured bushranger Hobson, who was later executed by hanging. Day later investigated a string of murders involving a hawker, Tommy Moore, by tracing his activities to South Australia, solving one of Australia's earliest serial-killer cases.

1894 – Arming
In 1894, a number of unarmed police were seriously injured while attempting to arrest a group of offenders as they attempted to break open a safe in the Union Steamship Company Office in Bridge Street, Sydney. The incident received wide publicity and was known as "Bridge Street Affray".

Within 24 hours, the Premier announced that all Police would wear firearms at all times while on duty to prevent the escape of felons and to place them on an equal footing with armed criminals. Previously, only police in rural districts had been permitted to carry firearms.

Parliament subsequently passed legislation authorising the arming of all members of the NSW Police Force and all Police have carried firearms ever since.

1979 – Lusher Commission of Inquiry

In 1979, the NSW government of Neville Wran called on Justice Edwin Lusher, a judge of the Supreme Court of New South Wales to chair a commission of inquiry into police administration.

1990 – Renaming
The Police Service Act 1990 was introduced to replace the Police Regulation Act. The Police Force was consequently renamed to the "New South Wales Police Service", which reflected "community-based policing at the time" of the Greiner government and the public's responsibility in crime control, aided by the police. In accordance with the Police Service Amendment (NSW Police) Bill in 2002, the New South Wales Police Service was then renamed again to simply New South Wales Police. The then Minister for Police, Michael Costa, explains:  In 2006, the Police Amendment (Miscellaneous) Bill resulted in a name change for the third time, renaming the New South Wales Police to New South Wales Police Force.

1991 – Amalgamation of special security units
In June 1991, the State Protection Group (SPG) was formed, incorporating the former Special Weapons and Operations Section (SWOS), the Witness Security Unit, regional Tactical Response Groups and the Rescue Squad. The Security Management Branch and the Bomb Disposal Unit were later included in the group.

The New South Wales Police Force has grown to be the largest in Australia.

1992 – Volunteering and NSW Police
After much debate, the NSW Parliament passed the Police Service (Volunteer Police) Amendment Act, 1992, which sought to trial voluntary service within the police force, along the lines of the United Kingdom's special constabularies. The trial was not successful and lapsed with the automatic repeal of the Act in 1994. The successor to this scheme was the Volunteers in Policing (VIP) program which restricts volunteer participation to non-core administration and community tasks, without enforcement duties or other powers being granted.

1995 – Wood Royal Commission

The 1990s was a turbulent period in NSW Police history. The Royal Commission into the New South Wales Police Service was held between 1995 and 1997. The Royal Commission uncovered hundreds of instances of bribery, money laundering, drug trafficking, and falsifying of evidence by police. Then Police Commissioner Tony Lauer resigned as the level of corruption within the service became clear, and his own position became untenable. Peter James Ryan was recruited from the United Kingdom. Wide-ranging reforms occurred as a result of the recommendations of the Royal Commission, including the establishment of a permanent Police Integrity Commission. The royal commissioner was Justice James Roland Wood. The terms of reference were to look into systemic and entrenched corruption within the New South Wales Police, towards the end of the Royal Commission it also investigated alleged paedophile activities within the Police Service. Of particular note was the Detectives' Division of the Kings Cross patrol, of which almost all the senior ranks, including the chief detective, were involved in serious and organised corrupt activities, including taking regular bribes from major drug traffickers.

2003 – Police bugging 

In 2003, Strike Force Emblems was established in response to allegations that warrants were improperly obtained during Operation Mascot, an investigation into police corruption in the late 1990s. The warrants authorised a large number of people, mostly police officers, to have their private conversations 'bugged'. Nearly a decade later in October 2012, the New South Wales Government announced that the Ombudsman would investigate allegations concerning the conduct of officers in the NSW Police Force, the Crime Commission and the Police Integrity Commission in relation to the matters investigated in Strike Force Emblems which occurred between 1998 and 2002. The final hearings were not completed until 31 March 2015.

The Acting NSW Ombudsman, John McMillan's report to Parliament was tabled on 20 December 2016.

2015 – Police Headquarters Shooting

On 2 October 2015, 15-year-old Iraqi-Kurdish boy Farhad Khalil Mohammad Jabar shot dead Curtis Cheng, a 58-year-old accountant who worked for the NSW Police Force, outside their Parramatta headquarters. The 15-year-old then shot at responding special constables, and died from their gunfire. NSW Police Force commissioner Andrew Scipione said "We believe that his actions were politically motivated and therefore linked to terrorism". The attack appears to have similar motives to the 2014 Endeavour Hills stabbings.

Organisation

Leadership Structure 

The headquarters of the New South Wales Police Force is located at 1 Charles Street, Parramatta, Sydney.

The current commissioner of the NSW Police Force is Karen Webb, . The Minister for Police, Paul Toole, is responsible to the Parliament of New South Wales for the police portfolio.

The Force is split into four divisions, each overseen by a Deputy Commissioner.

Police Area Commands and Police Districts
The state's 432 police stations are organised into six Regions, which are then divided into Police Area Commands (PACs, consisting of metropolitan areas) and Police Districts (PDs, consisting of rural areas). Each region contains 7-12 PACs/PDs, which are listed by name and CAD prefix/vehicle ID. 

Note: Some specialist units use region codes as their callsign, for example Highway Patrol and Regional Enforcement Squads, which utilise callsigns such as NWM212 and SWM511.

Specialist units

Police Transport & Public Safety Command 
The Police Transport Command (PTC) is a high visibility proactive policing unit responsibility for dealing with crime and anti-social behaviour on the public transport network. PTC officers deploy across public transport based on criminal intelligence and targeting known hot spots, in addition to conducting operations during high traffic events. Modes of transport covered by PTC include trains, buses, ferries, taxis and light rail. PTC works closely on operations with other specialist commands, such as the Dog Unit, which assist in drug detection on public transport. PTC takes part in Project Servator, a policing project designed to disrupt criminal activity, including terrorism, while providing a reassuring Police presence for the public. Project Servator officers are specially trained to spot tell-tale signs that someone is planning or preparing to commit a crime, and work to empower the public to remain vigilant and report when they see something unusual or suspicious.

The Marine Area Command (MAC), commonly referred to as the Water Police, is responsible for policing the waterways and coast of NSW. The MAC operates a fleet of over 50 vessels along the NSW coast, tasked with crime prevention and detection on waterways, overseeing aquatic events and controlling spectator craft, co-ordinating and conducting maritime search and rescue operations and enforcing safety and compliance among those on the water. The MAC is responsible for the waters up to 200 nautical miles off the NSW coast and operates 11 sea going vessels, including the OPV Nemesis the largest purpose built Police boat in the Southern Hemisphere. The MAC frequently conducts high visibility policing operations, utilising its road vehicles to transport police boats and jet skis to target locations, including inland waterways such as lakes and rivers. The Marine Operations Support Team (MOST) conducts specialist marine operations such as ship boarding and marine security at major events. Police Divers conduct SCUBA operations, primarily conducting search and recovery operations for important evidence and missing persons.

The Mounted Unit (see further NSW Police Mounted Unit) conducts policing operations on horseback. The unit operates 34 horses, providing crowd management at major events, supporting Police during civil unrest and public order incidents, conducting search missions over tough terrain and general police patrols. The unit also conducts ceremonial duties.

The Dog Unit, commonly referred to as the Dog Squad, provides specialist canines to support policing duties. General Purpose Dogs are used to support typical front line policing operations, with common tasks including tracking offenders, searching for evidence, searching for missing persons, supporting police officers in dangerous situations and conducting high visibility foot patrols in busy areas and at major events. The unit also utilises several different types of dogs for a number of specialist roles including:

 Tactical Dogs
 Blood Hounds
 Cadaver Dogs
 Drug Detection Dogs
 Explosive and Firearm Detection Dogs
 Urban Search and Rescue Dogs

The Aviation Command, commonly referred to as Pol Air, operates a fleet of nine aircraft that support policing from the air. Operations conducted by Pol Air include aerial patrols, tracking of offenders (including vehicle and foot pursuits), searching for missing persons (including suspects, the elderly, children and bushwalkers), searching for missing vessels and aircraft, conducting rescue missions (including water rescues with their trained rescue swimmers), providing air cover for major events and incidents, aerial surveillance, aerial speed enforcement, reconnaissance, counter-terrorism operations and transporting specialist Police elements and equipment. Aircraft are equipped with advanced integrated technology systems including high-definition cameras, forward looking infra red (FLIR) cameras, 30 million candle power search lights, live video downlink capability and advanced navigation programs. The fleet consists of six helicopters (3x Bell 429, 2x Bell 412EPI and 1x Eurocopter EC135) and three fixed-wing aircraft (2x Cessna 208 and 1x Cessna 206).

The School Liaison Police (SLP), are officers who work with high schools to reduce youth crime, violence and anti-social behaviour through a range of school intervention strategies, educational programs and local relationships that model respect and responsibility. Officers develop and present programs in conjunction with teaching staff and act as a central point of contact on Police, community and school issues. SLP officers may provide information, support and guidance on security, intervention strategies and child protection matters relating to the school as well as other issues relating to safety and community responsibility.

Counter Terrorism & Special Tactics Command 
The Rescue and Bomb Disposal Unit (RBDU) provides specialised emergency support to Police activities. Its capabilities include conducting rescue operations, accessing and restraining suicidal persons and illegal demonstrators in precarious situations such as atop buildings, co-ordination of land searches for missing persons, conducting complex body recoveries (such as people down cliffs) and crime scene support, including scene preservation, evidence protection and assisting investigators with logistics such as lighting and tents. The RBDU also provides the Police Force’s bomb squad capability.

The Public Order and Riot Squad (PORS) (see further: NSW Police PORS) provides a surge capacity to support Police operations, as well as a number of specialist support functions. The squad operates in teams of three-four from specially equipped black four wheel drive vehicles and are deployed across NSW on a regular needs basis. Its primary roles include crowd management, riot control, executing moderate risk search warrants, missing persons searches, evidence searches, disaster victim identification (DVI), chemical, biological and radiological response, searches for explosive devices, high visibility policing at major events such as festivals and sports games, conducting high-impact police operations in known trouble spots for violence such as Kings Cross, and assisting at incidents in correctional facilities. The squad moveS freely around the city throughout the day, travelling to hot spot areas as they flare up. The squad IS also equipped with M4 assault rifles and specialist training where they can provide a first response capability to active shooter and terror incidents.

The Tactical Operations Unit (TOU) is responsible for the most dangerous and high risk police operations involving armed offenders in complex situations. The unit is equipped with specialist firearms including submachine guns, rifles and shotguns, along with specialist equipment and vehicles such as armoured Chevrolet vans and Lenco BearCat armoured vehicles. Their roles include high risk search warrants, the arrests of armed and dangerous criminals, dealing with active armed offenders, containing and resolving siege situations, dealing with complex situations such as barricaded suspects, hostage takings and hijackings and conducting counter-terrorism operations. The unit is supported by the Tactical Operations Regional Support (TORS) unit, which provides a part-time tactical response capability in the regional areas of the state, made up of regular officers who receive high level tactical operations training and equipment. There is a number of specialist roles within the unit including TOU Snipers and Intelligence Officers.

The Negotiations Unit provides specialist negotiators responsible for negotiating with suicidal and emotionally disturbed persons, extortion/kidnapping situations, escapees, barricaded offenders, sieges and hostage situations.

The Protection Operations Unit (POU) coordinates security operations within NSW for Internationally Protected Persons and public dignitaries considered to be at risk. Within the POU is the Witness Security Group, which is responsible for the security and protection of key witnesses, including the operation of safe houses.

State Crime Command 
The Drug and Firearms Squad conducts investigations into organised criminal networks involved in the supply, distribution and production of illicit drugs and firearms.

The Criminal Groups Squad and Strike Force Raptor target groups and individuals who engage in serious and organised crime, in particular those who have a propensity for violence. This is achieved with proactive investigations and intelligence-based, high-impact policing operations with the intention of preventing and disrupting conflicts, and prosecuting and dismantling networks engaged in serious criminal activity.

The Organised Crime Squad targets high level organised crime, disrupting its activities, identifying the people and groups involved in organised crime groups and effecting their arrest. This includes targeting organised criminal activity connected with licensed casinos, the racing industry and money laundering activities.

The Cybercrime Squad is responsible for investigating cyber-enabled and cyber-dependent crime. The squad investigates complex cyber offences requiring advanced technical skill and capability, and processes all reports received through the Reportcyber portal, determining the appropriate course of action.

The Homicide Squad is responsible for homicide investigations, including the investigation of murders, suspicious deaths, coronial investigations and critical incidents.

The Child Abuse and Sex Crimes Squad is responsible for investigating sex crimes that are protracted, complex, serial and serious in nature along with the physical and sexual abuse and neglect of children under 16. The squad maintains a Child Protection Register and support local Police investigations, as well as working closely with other local, federal and international law enforcement agencies.

The Financial Crimes Squad is responsible for investigating fraud, identity crime, motor vehicle theft/re-birthing (including precious and scrap metal theft) and arson (including structural and bushfires).

The Robbery and Serious Crime Squad is responsible for investigating robbery, extortion, kidnap for ransom, product contamination and other serious property crime, including major break in offences on commercial premises.

Traffic and Highway Patrol Command 
The Highway Patrol is responsible for road policing across the state, with the aim to minimise road trauma, promote orderly and safe road use, and ensure the free flow of traffic. Highway Patrol duties include patrols targeting driving behaviour, speed enforcement, registration enforcement, ensuring vehicles are safe and roadworthy, conducting random drug and alcohol testing (both during traffic stops and at dedicated roadside checkpoints), working with the Transport Management Centre to manage traffic during incidents, maintaining urgent road closures (such as during emergencies like bushfires), conducting emergency escorts for ambulances transporting critically injured patients (done in conjunction with the Transport Management Centre to provide a ‘green light corridor’), conducting urgent organ transports (typically between hospitals and airports) and leading vehicle pursuits within the Safe Driver Policy.

The Traffic Strike Force targets specific aspects of road safety across the state, supporting local Highway Patrol in targeted patrols and operations. The strike force provides a surge capacity where Police can saturate specific areas with patrols based on intelligence and local requests, along with providing the ability to conduct large scale traffic operations such as mass random breath and drug testing. The strike force also conducts long term operations such as Operation Free Flow and Operation Mercury, targeting main arterial roads.

The Traffic Support Group (TSG) consists of a small task force of police motorcyclists, with the primary objective of providing VIP escort services for visiting dignitaries and heads of state. The group are also deployed in a similar manner to the Traffic Strike Force, where bikes are sent out into areas across the road network where required, where they target road safety issues along with specific offences such as the use of mobile phones while driving. The group also assist in providing medical escorts.

The Transport Task Force (TTF) is a specialist Highway Patrol Task Force which targets heavy vehicle safety and compliance. The team operates closely with Transport for NSW Heavy Vehicle Inspectors, conducting proactive operations where heavy vehicles are stopped and inspected by Police and RMS at random roadside inspection points. They also operate in response to serious heavy vehicle incidents, conducting raids and blitz inspectors of bus and trucking yards of companies following serious and fatal crashess involving their heavy vehicles.

Strike Force Puma (SF Puma) targets high-risk drivers who display extreme and erratic behaviours, and those with a history of licence and drink/drug driving offences, who pose the highest risk to the community on the road. In a similar manner to how repeat domestic violence and drug offenders are targeted by dedicated Police units, the Strike Force targets high-risk drivers with a known dangerous history and multiple repeat offences. The team also investigates video footage obtained by Police of dangerous driving from sources such as social media and dash cams.

The Crash Investigation Unit (CIU) provides expertise in motor vehicle crash investigations, particularly crashes involving criminal offences. The unit attends and investigates fatal crashes resulting in death or where death is likely and serious crashes where criminal charges are likely. Other types of crashes investigated include those where the responsible party cannot be determined, serious crashes where a driver has fled the scene, serious crashes where an on duty Police officer is involved and other major incidents of unusual nature such as bus crashes.

Forensic Evidence & Technical Services Command 
The Forensic Evidence & Technical Services Command (FETSC) has over 900 Police and civilian staff to provide high quality forensic and technical services to assist investigations, prevent and disrupt crime, protect the community and serve the justice system.

Some of the capabilities provided by the Command include:

 Collection and analysis of physical and electronic evidence at crime and incident scenes.
 Scientific analysis, interpretation of evidence and presentation of evidence to courts.
 Identification of persons through biometric means, fingerprints and DNA to assist in criminal, incident and coronial investigations.
 Identification of persons through criminal history to provide background information to the courts to inform decisions.
 Criminal record and fingerprint-based background checking to assist in placing the 'right persons' in the 'right places' for specific jobs, visas and adoptions, to name a few.
 Provision of forensic intelligence to assist solving crime across boundaries; linking crimes across different evidence types.
 Provision of advice and logistical support to the NSW Police response to chemical, biological, radiological, nuclear and explosive incidents and Disaster Victim Identification events.
 Facilitation of targeted research and innovative development opportunities in collaboration with other forensic and educational institutions

Education and training

NSW Police Force Academy, Goulburn

The New South Wales Police Force Academy is situated on 40 hectares of land in the city of Goulburn, in the Southern Tablelands of NSW, located 200 kilometres south of Sydney.

The Academy buildings are extensive, consisting of 80 training facilities such as lecture theatres, classrooms, virtual weapons training facility, live-fire indoor pistol range, a simulation training venue, scenario village, library, indoor and outdoor physical fitness areas, coin-operated laundry facilities and Charles Sturt University Wi-Fi access. The Police Driver Training Complex is located approximately 5 km from the main Academy and comprises about 80 hectares of land, including specialist training facilities. The Goulburn Academy also boasts recreation and common room facilities, the Police Shop, Police Bank with ATM, St Michael's Police Chapel and access to a range of amenities available in the township of Goulburn. There are about 1000 people on site each day, including police officers, policing students, Charles Sturt University staff and contractors. Accommodation facilities consist of 816 single residential rooms, 30 motel style units, 10 flats and houses. Catering and cleaning are provided by external contractors, with the dining room serving approximately 2,000 meals daily.

Located in the Memorial and Honour Precincts, the Academy has a number of memorials dedicated to the proud traditions of the New South Wales Police Force, namely the Walls of Remembrance at the College Chapel (which features on the north side those who have died on duty, and those who have served in war and peacekeeping operations featured on the south side); the Rose Garden and Eternal Flame; the NSW Police Force Horse & Dog Memorial; and Heroes' Walk (featuring 15 bravery banners including George Cross, Cross of Valour, Star of Courage and George Medal police recipients). The latest aspect to the "proud traditions project" was the installation of the NSW Police Academy Peacekeeping display. The display features a range of memorabilia and photographs from peacekeeping missions that NSW Police Force members have contributed to. The display also features the Dag Hammerskjold Medal belonging to the late Sergeant Ian Ward, on loan from the AFP.

Application and Training
NSW Police Force applicants must have enrolled in and completed the University Certificate in Workforce Essentials (UCWE), an eight-weeks' course run by Charles Sturt University, which introduces students to communication, resolving conflict with communication skills, legal framework, crime and policing, writing documents, ethical practices, cultural diversity, leadership and teamwork, workplace practices and obligations, technology, personal resilience, and safe driving.

After completing the UCWE, a First Aid Certificate and a Swim Rescue Test, an applicant can submit their Police Application. Upon receipt of the Police Application, applicants undergo a number of background checks including detailed background vetting, employment checks and a thorough investigation of an applicants history.

Applicants then undergo a physical assessment, a medical assessment and then a face to face interview with a 3 person panel. Applicants are then ranked and selected to attend the Goulburn Police Academy based on their scores.

The Goulburn Police Academy program begins with eight weeks of online lectures from home (Session 1 Block 1), before students attend the academy for six weeks of further training (Session 1 Block 2). Students then take part in a one week placement in a Police Area Command. Students then return to Goulburn for a further 16 weeks of training (Session 2).

An important part of students' training includes the use of weapons and police tactics. Students are trained in weaponless control, where they learn to apply defensive and restraining techniques in appropriate situations. Students are trained in the use of Police appointments, including handcuffs, batons, capsicum spray and tasers. Students are also trained in the use of the Glock 22 service pistol. Students must be able to demonstrate positive weapons handling, marksmanship and a detailed understanding of the justifiable use of a firearm in accordance with the NSW Police Force policy. Students are then faced with simulation training, where they’re required to demonstrate effective communication skills and operational tactics in a simulated initial response situation, while also demonstrating a professional and ethical understanding of legal use of force.

Following the completion of Session 2, students receive an offer of employment from the NSW Police Force. They must then complete a further 42 weeks of online training (Sessions 3, 4 and 5) before finally graduating as a police officer.

In total students receive 73 weeks of training, combining theory and practical skills ranging from shooting to driving. Following graduation, officers continue to maintain their skills through regular training and recertification, along with the ability to gain further specialist qualifications and skills in Specialist Police commands.

Equipment and uniform

Arms and appointments

Police Armoury
The Police Armoury was established in 1872 and provides specialist engineering services, maintenance and supply of ammunition, firearms and weapons systems for the NSW Police Force.

Firearms

Members of the NSW Police Force are issued with the Glock 22 .40-calibre semi-automatic pistol. After the work of Task Force ALPHA 1992 and the research testing and report done by senior constable Darren Stewart recommending the introduction of the Glock 22 superseding the Smith & Wesson .38 calibre model 10 revolver with some specialist sections and plain clothes officers having either the smaller Glock 23 or Glock 27 models available in lieu of the standard model. Members are also issued with a spare magazine for their pistol due to the murder of two officers, armed with 6 shot revolvers, at Crescent Head in 1995 when officers carried the Smith & Wesson Model 10 in .38 Special. Specialist tactical units such as the full-time Tactical Operations Unit (and part-time regional State Protection Support Units) are equipped with a variety of specialised firearms for their duties. The Public Order and Riot Squad are issued with a variety of specialist equipment for their roles including Colt M4 Carbine rifles.

Equipment and holsters 

In addition to the standard issue firearm, officers are issued with Saflock (mark IV & V) handcuffs, OC (oleoresin capsicum spray), expandable baton, Motorola XTS5000/XTS2500/APX6000/APX7000 (Digital UHF) or Tait Orca (VHF) portable radio, and a first-aid kit. Members have access to a fixed baton and Maglite rechargeable torch, which are usually located in all first response Police vehicles for each officer "on the truck". There is also access to high ballistic rated overt body armour in every vehicle as required. Specialist tactical officers from elite units such as the State Protection Group and riot officers from the Public Order and Riot Squad have access to a variety of specialised weapons and equipment.

The NSW Police Force has issued TASER electronic control devices (ECDs) which generally are carried by one officer on every first response general duties vehicle. TASER is also issued to some specialist squads (e.g. Public Order and Riot Squad, Tactical Operations Unit and State Protection Support Units). Each Taser X26P issued to Police includes an integrated camera to record all deployments of the device as well as any additional video while the device's safety is switched off. The grip used by police may result in no video footage being available; however, audio footage is still "loud and clear". This is due, for safety reasons, to the grip being the same as that used to hold the glock pistol.

The majority of officers carry their equipment on a leather or cordura duty appointment belt. In recent times, there has been a large movement within the police to implement changes in methods of equipment carry to relieve officers with back injuries. This has ranged from trials of lightweight nylon duty belts (such as the shapeshifter "gel belt"), to thigh holsters for firearms and load-bearing equipment vests. As of 2010, the load-bearing vest has become increasingly prevalent among general duty officers and it is anticipated that this trend will continue. It is believed that the vests are effective in relieving officers of chronic back pain, as it takes most of the weight away from the waist and back area, and distributes it across the frontal area of the officer's torso. In 2017, a new load-bearing vest was introduced the Integrated Light Armour Vest (ILAV) that is level 2 ballistic rated and level 2 stab resistance rated which can be worn without armour and has the option of a hydration pack and a backpack. Also in 2017, a new covert vest was introduced the Covert Light Armour Vest (CLAV).

Field and service dress 

New South Wales Police Force has two uniforms for general duties police officers, one operational (field dress) and one ceremonial (service dress).

Field dress consists of navy blue cargo pants with map pockets, ballooned at the bottom, light blue marle short- or long-sleeve shirt, navy blue baseball cap with blue and white Sillitoe tartan, and black general purpose boots. A utility vest is also worn, carrying various equipment such as body cameras, pepper spray, batons and radio. During winter a navy blue Polartec-brand polar fleece jacket or leather jacket is worn. Ranks are worn on the shoulders by both NCOs and commissioned ranks. All officers are also supplied with high-visibility vests and raincoats that can be worn over the standard uniform.

Service dress consists of general purpose boots, straight leg navy blue trousers, blue marle shirt, antron cap/hat and leather duty jacket. Depending on rank, members may be issued with high-shine polishable lace-up leather boots for ceremonial occasions, similar to that worn by military personnel.

Officers wear a similar uniform when attending court proceedings. This is usually the full-service dress both during summer and winter.

NSW Police Force College staff, New South Wales Police Force protocol and NSW Police Force field protocol officers generally wear a navy blue ceremonial tunic during official occasions such as attestation parades (passing out parades), medal ceremonies, funerals, etc.

Field protocol officers are issued with a light blue/navy blue lanyard to be worn over the right shoulder and tucked into the right pocket during ceremonial occasions.

Full-time protocol officers and members of the VIP cyclists are entitled to wear a black basketweave Sam Browne belt during ceremonial occasions.

In line with the name change of the organisation back to "NSW Police Force", the current shoulder patch for uniform reads "New South Wales Police Force" and has a redesigned and re-coloured eagle.

Specialist groups and special events
New South Wales Police Force officers are also entitled to wear mess dress with mess kit for black tie or formal dinners/dances. The dark navy blue trousers and mess jacket with cobalt blue cuffs, epaulettes (with ranks) and lapels clearly identify them as being members of the Police Force.

Specialist units such as the Public Order and Riot Squad, Homicide Squad, Marine Area Command and the State Protection Group Tactical Operations Unit all have different uniform needs and are outfitted accordingly such as Rescue and Bomb Disposal Unit with their white overalls, Tactical Operations Unit (TOU) with black and Dog Squad with subdued blue. Detectives wear plain clothes.

During ANZAC Day marches and United Nations Day marches in Sydney, Police officers can be seen alongside their Australian Federal Police counterparts wearing the distinctive United Nations blue beret and full-sized medals, if they have served with the Australian Federal Police in United Nations sanctioned peacekeeping operations.

Name plates and identification

Each police officer is issued an identification metal badge with a Warrant Card. Behind the Police badge, a member has a coloured plastic backing card that helps identify a member's rank in the force, namely:

light blue – Constable or Senior Constable
dark blue – Sergeant or Senior Sergeant
red – Inspector or Chief Inspector
green – Superintendent or Chief Superintendent
white – Assistant Commissioner, Deputy Commissioner or Commissioner

This colour-coding also occurs on members' name plates. For administrative officers of all grades and Special Constables, their name plates are gold. Volunteers in Policing wear black nameplates. Civilian staff are not issued with badges except for Special Constables who are issued a metal wallet badge with a gold plastic backing board. Special Constables and civilian forensics staff are also issued with warrant cards. Everyone else such as plainclothes police officers is issued an Identification Certificate (Identification Card).

Fleet 

NSW Police Force has the largest government fleet in Australia, with more than 4,000 vehicles, on a lease basis. Holden Commodores and Ford Falcons traditionally made up the bulk of both General Duties and Highway Patrol fleets. However, most LAC response vehicles (General Duties) now operate with a fleet made up of Volkswagen Passats, Holden ZB Commodores and Hyundai Sonatas. Holden Colorados, Ford Rangers, and Hyundai iLoads are all used as caged vehicles or "paddy wagons", while Volkswagen Tiguans are used as Dog Unit vehicles.

Highway Patrol vehicles usually consist of a combination of marked and unmarked vehicles, including the BMW 530d, Chrysler 300c SRT and a smaller number of Toyota LandCruisers for rural work.

A large fleet of road motorcycles are also used, consisting of BMW R1250RT's and Yamaha FJR1300's. A small number of trail bikes are also used for off-road duty. Other specialist sections and units use a variety of vehicles including Iveco Daily and Mercedes-Benz Sprinter vans, along with a range of Isuzutrucks as specialist rescue and bomb disposal vehicles and two Lenco BearCat armoured trucks.

Police Aviation Support Branch 

The current Pol Air fleet is composed of 8 aircraft – five helicopters and three fixed-wing aircraft:

Helicopters: Polair 1–5
 1 – 2020 Bell 429 (VH-PHW)
 2 – 2017 Bell 412EPI (VH-PQZ)
 3 – 2020 Bell 429 (VH-PHB)
 4 – 2020 Bell 429 (VH-PHM)
 5 – 2014 Bell 412EP (VH-PHZ)

Fixed-wing aircraft: Polair 6–8
 6 – single-engine turboprop Textron 208B Caravan (VH-DVV)
 7 – single-engine turboprop Cessna 208B Caravan (VH-DFV)
 8 – single-engine turboprop Textron 208B Caravan (VH-DQV)

The aircraft are equipped with modern technology and specialist equipment including rescue winches, Nite sun searchlights (30 million candle power), forward-looking infrared (FLIR), high definition video camera system, microwave down-linking of live pictures, digital radio communications and advanced integrated touch screen digital glass cockpits with global positioning satellite (GPS) navigation systems.

The fixed wing Cessna 206H aircraft, callsign Polair 6, is primarily used for aerial speed enforcement along major freeways and highways in the State. It is also used to transport officers and assist with search operations in remote areas of the State.

The much larger Cessna 208 Grand Caravan, callsign Polair 7, provides Police with a long-range, heavy lift capability allowing for the transport of cargo, specialist equipment and personnel during extensive search and rescue incidents, which is ideal for use in remote locations across the state.
Various other fixed-wing aircraft such as a leased Cessna 500 have been used for major operations including the APEC Australia 2007 security operation. Another was also used during the Sydney Olympic Games in 2000.

Marine Area Command 

The Marine Area Command vessels and personnel are strategically located at important commercial and leisure ports with the base at Balmain on Sydney Harbour. The Command is also based at Broken Bay, Newcastle, Port Stephens, Coffs Harbour, Botany Bay, Port Kembla and Eden. It has 123 operational water police, marine intelligence unit, marine crime prevention officer, divers, detectives and the marine operational support team, and employs six civilian engineers and 30 deck hands.

The current fleet consists of 11 seagoing craft, including OPV Nemesis, the largest purpose-built Police boat in the Southern Hemisphere, and a number of smaller boats. In January 2013 seven new "class 4" Rigid-hulled inflatable boat watercraft were rolled out across the state to Balmain, Botany Bay and Broken Bay.

Rank structure

The New South Wales Police Force is run as a community policing model. All sworn members start at the lowest rank of Probationary Constable / Constable. Promotion beyond Senior Constable is highly competitive. The following ranks are listed lowest to highest from left as set out in 2002.

Constables
All grades of Constable perform the same basic range of duties, with the rank only reflecting experience. The rank of Probationary Constable is held for the first 12 months of service. Following 12 months of satisfactory service and on completion of the Associate Degree of Policing Practice via distance education, the Probationary Constable is confirmed to the rank of Constable.

Promotion to the rank of Senior Constable can be obtained after five years service and requires the officer to pass an examination that can cover a broad area of policing knowledge. Incremental Senior Constable is obtained after 10 years of service. Senior Constables of all grades are referred to as either "Senior Constable" or "senior".

Leading Senior Constable is a rank that primarily sees an officer in a training role and belongs to a specific unit or duty type of which there is a limited number with progression to such being competitive and non-transferable. If an LSC transfers from a unit or duty type (such as from highway patrol to general duties or vice versa) they revert to their original Senior Constable rank. To be eligible for LSC an officer must have a minimum of seven years service, be of the rank of Senior Constable and undergo a number of tests and selection processes in competition with other applicants.

Non-commissioned officers

Promotion to the rank of Sergeant and beyond is achieved by way of a "merit-based" promotion system, whereby officers undertake a series of "pre-qualification assessments" and are placed on a ranked list before gaining promotion. Officers who qualify for a promotion list are given an eligibility mark and are ranked according to order of merit from the highest mark to the lowest. This means that the highest-ranked member on the promotions list will be considered first for the rank and position concerned. Members seeking placement on a promotion list must have spent the requisite time at the rank below, which is at least two years, and must have successfully completed the relevant pre-qualifying assessment examinations, an applicant evaluation and must meet the eligibility program. A new promotion list for each rank or grade is prepared each year, and an applicant who does not accept promotion can remain on a list only for three years before having to requalify for the list.

On promotion to Sergeant and Senior Sergeant, members are issued a warrant of appointment under the Commissioner's hand and seal.

A Sergeant normally supervises a team of Constables during a shift. A Detective Sergeant is normally in charge of a team in a specific part of either a Local Area Command detectives' office or a specialist squad in the State Crime Command.

The Incremental Sergeant is not a rank, instead it means that the sergeant wears a small crown above the chevrons indicating that they have reached the highest step in the rank of Sergent.

Senior sergeants are generally attached to "regions" as region training coordinators, region traffic coordinators, region operations coordinator positions or in legal services, professional standards, protocol, education services and perform middle-management duties.

Sergeants and Incremental Sergeants are referred to as "Sergeant"; Senior Sergeants are referred to as "Senior Sergeant".

Commissioned officers
On completing at least three years as a Sergeant (but usually more), and the relevant assessments including an exam and interview. Once an officer completes this they may be elevated to the rank of "Inspector" and issued a certificate of commission under the Commissioner's hand and seal. Commissioned officers may be acknowledged by the rank they hold or, more commonly, as "sir", "ma'am" or "boss" ("boss" is usually used as a term of endearment for officers that are respected by the subordinate rank).

An Inspector oversees Sergeants and teams of Constables and traditionally performs more administrative work, micromanagement of the team, coordination of policing operations or specialist work. At Police Area Commands, an Inspector is allocated to each shift as a "Duty Officer" who oversees the general running of the Police Station (more often than not their tasks and roles are delegated to the supervising Sergeants on shift).

Superintendents are usually "commanders" of Police Area Commands or specialist units.

Assistant Commissioners are generally "commanders" of regions or corporate portfolios.

As of 2010, the rank of Senior Assistant Commissioner had been dispensed with. Officers currently holding that rank will retain it until retiring or upon promotion to a higher rank.

Honorary Commissions
As of July 2014, the New South Wales Police Force has begun bestowing the honorary rank and title of “Governor of the New South Wales Police Force” upon currently serving Governor of New South Wales.  This position was created by then Commissioner Andrew Scipione, in order to honour former governor Marie Bashir’s service to the New South Wales Police Force.

The Governor of the New South Wales Police Force wears the same uniform as commissioned officers of the force but has the rank insignia being the State Badge surmounted by a crown.

The current Governor to hold this title is Margaret Beazley.

Designations
If a New South Wales Police Force officer elects to undertake criminal investigation duties, after a period of exams and assignments, and given experience in a criminal investigation office that officer is given the designation of "Detective". As it is a designation and not a rank, the designation comes prior to the rank (e.g., Detective Constable, Detective Senior Constable, etc.).

Returning to general duties (uniform) is common for Detectives as they are unable to be promoted with their own field and believe general duties is an easy role to perform. Many Detectives do seek promotion in the general duties arena before realising that general duties is not as simple as it appears. However, while they do not lose their Detectives' designation if they leave full-time investigation duties they are not permitted to use their designation while performing general duties or other duties which are not an authorised investigative position. Many do return to Detective duties after three years in uniform after they have gained the rank.

On returning to an authorised position, they can use their designation again without having to requalify. During 2021 designated Detectives received a special badge that states “New South Wales Police Force” along the top and “Detective” along the bottom; this is on top of the specialist pay they receive. They only are allowed to have this special badge while undertaking Detective duties.

Symbols and traditions

NSW Police Force Banner
On 29 September 2006, Governor of New South Wales Marie Bashir presented the NSW Police Banner to the New South Wales Police Force at a ceremony adjacent to the NSW Police Force Roll of Honour at The Domain. Later that day, the banner led the NSW Police Force marching contingent at the dedication of the National Police Memorial in Canberra.

Flag and pennants
The Force has an official flag, with the Nemesis logo on a light blue over white bicolour.

The Mounted Police unit carries swallow-tailed navy blue and white pennants on lances, without the Nemesis logo.

The Commissioner and the VIP cyclists have a Nemesis logo on a light blue over white bicolour pennant on their transportation. The pennant is swallow-tailed.

NSW Police Band
The NSW Police Band was established in 1895 and is the longest-serving uniformed concert band in Australia. It today incorporates 10 different ensembles, used for different activities. It is regarded as the "State Band of New South Wales" and is one of only two full-time police bands in existence in the country.

NSW Pipe Band
The pipe band is an auxiliary unit of the Police band. It was founded in 1946. Its first official engagement was the Newcastle Centenary Celebrations in September 1947. During the early 90’s, the band was shut down as a cost cutting measure. Many ex-members went onto reform the band in an unofficial capacity during the ANZAC Day march in the early '90s. It has participated in events such as the Royal Edinburgh Military Tattoo in Sydney. It is also stilled called upon to perform at attestation parades and national police Remembrance Day.

Honours and awards
Recognition for the bravery and sacrifice of members of the New South Wales Police Force is expressed through honours and awards. The New South Wales Police Force was the first Australian Police jurisdiction to have one of its members awarded the Imperial Honour, namely the George Cross and the Australian Honour the Cross of Valour. Sergeant 3rd Class Eric George Bailey GC was awarded the George Cross posthumously on 12 January 1945.

The New South Wales Police Force also has the distinction in having one of its members being awarded the highest civilian bravery award, namely the Cross of Valour. In its history, only five people have received that award, with a New South Wales Police Officer being the first Australian Police Officer to do so. On 3 May 1996, then Detective Senior Constable Sparkes rescued a boy trapped in a flooded underground storm water drain following record rainfalls at Coffs Harbour.

As of 2023, no new recommendations for bravery awards have been made for several years.

Australian honours and awards
New South Wales Police Force Officers are eligible for the following National Honours and Awards:
 Australian Bravery Decorations, namely the Cross of Valour (CV), Star of Courage (SC), Bravery Medal (BM) and the Commendation for Brave Conduct
 Australian Police Medal (APM) 
 Police Overseas Service Medal
 National Police Service Medal
 National Medal
 Campaign Medals such as United Nations Medal For Service

Internal New South Wales Police honours and awards
New South Wales Police Force also has a number of in-service Honours and Awards, awarded by the Commissioner. Former Commissioner Peter Ryan QPM implemented the New South Wales Police Force Commissioner's Olympic Commendation and the New South Wales Police Force Olympic Citation. This award is significant as the New South Wales Police Force is the only Police Force in the world to be permitted the Olympic Rings to be attached. It has been widely reported and accepted that the Sydney 2000 Olympics was the "Safest Games in modern Olympics history".

Former commissioner Ken Moroney AO APM implemented the Commissioner's Community Service Commendation and Community Service Citation in 2002.

Police honours and awards are highly prized partly because they are only awarded to members in small numbers. The only award that was given out in large numbers was the Commissioner's Olympic Citation due to the massive contribution by all members of the force.

Commendations and medals
 New South Wales Police Force Valour Award (VA)
 New South Wales Police Force Commissioner's Commendation (Courage)
 New South Wales Police Force Commissioner's Commendation (Service)
 New South Wales Police Force Commissioner's Olympic Commendation
 New South Wales Police Force Commissioner's Community Service Commendation
 New South Wales Police Force Medal for Diligent and Ethical Service (awarded after 10 years' service, with clasps awarded for every five years thereafter)
The above in-service decorations are worn 5 mm below the officer's name plate and are right-sided decorations.

Citations
The following in-service decorations are worn 5 mm above the officer's name plate and are right-sided decorations.
 New South Wales Police Force Unit Citation (maximum three further awards are indicated by silver stars) – metal device, with silver laurel leaf surround, with light blue enamel centre - only awarded to detectives.
 New South Wales Police Force Commissioner's Community Service Citation (maximum one further award indicated by one silver star) – metal device, with silver laurel leaf surround, with white enamel centre.
 New South Wales Police Force Commissioner's Olympic Citation – metal device, with silver laurel leaf surround, with navy blue enamel centre and silver Olympic rings.
 New South Wales Police Force Commissioner's Sesquicentenary Citation – metal device, with thin silver surround, with navy blue and light blue striped enamel centre and silver numerals of '1862' '150' '2012' with a depiction of the State of NSW and Silitoe tartan.
 New South Wales Police Commissioner’s Emergency Citation - A drop ribbon similar to other Commissioner awards. Awarded to all New South Wales Police Force employees for service during 2021.

Peacekeeping
In peacekeeping operations, officers are seconded to the Australian Federal Police and take an oath or affirmation of the AFP. They are then appointed to the rank of Senior Sergeant, Station Sergeant, Superintendent or Commander. Following their service, UN peacekeeping veterans are awarded the United Nations Medal for their particular mission. In addition, under the Australian system of honours and awards, Police officers serving with peacekeeping organisations are awarded the Police Overseas Service Medal with the relevant clasp for the prescribed area of service. As of 2008, two clasps to that medal were awarded to members for operations in Cyprus and East Timor.

Cyprus (UNFICYP)
Members were among the first Australian Police sent to Cyprus in May 1964 as the first UN Police contingent. The UN Civilian Police (now known as UNPOL or United Nations Police) was established with a three-months' mandate to end hostilities between the Greek and Turkish communities and promote peace on the island. The operation is ongoing.

Members were subsequently withdrawn from Cyprus in 1976, along with all other State and Territory Police following the Turkish invasion of Cyprus on 20 July 1974. During the invasion and preceding it the Australian Police were subject to machine gun and mortar fire and Turkish air attack. Some of their personal motor vehicles, motorcycles and personal items at that time were destroyed, lost or stolen. Fortunately, there was no loss of Australian lives at that time. Australian Police continued to negotiate between the invading Turkish army, other warring parties and escorted refugees to safety from both sides. Since UNFICYP commenced, a large number of the NSW Police has served in Cyprus alongside other Australian police jurisdictions.

East Timor (UNTAET and UNMISET)
From 2000 to 2005, 45 NSW Police Force officers were involved in the United Nations Transitional Administration in East Timor (UNTAET) and the United Nations Mission of Support in East Timor (UNMISET) seconded to the Australian Federal Police for their Tour of Duty in East Timor with the United Nations. There have only been three female NSWP officers to serve.

In addition, two New South Wales Police Force officers have been commended for courage for peacekeeping in East Timor, one by the Australian government, and the Australian Federal Police Commissioners Commendation for Bravery (station sergeant David McCann OAM – UNMISET and one by the commissioner (senior sergeant Mark Aubrey Gilpin – UNTAET). McCann was awarded the Commendation for Brave Conduct for his part in the rescue of 110 vulnerable persons from a village in East Timor after it suffered major flooding. Gilpin was awarded the New South Wales Police Commendation (courage) for his part in protecting a member of the community who was being subjected to mob justice. He placed his body in front of the mob, which were armed with machetes and other weapons, and managed to extract the victim to safety.

Out of the 10 Australian peacekeepers who have died on peacekeeping missions, two were from the NSW Police Force while serving with UNFICYP. Sergeant Ian Ward and Inspector Patrick Hackett died in separate incidents in UNFCYP. A total of 124 soldiers and police gave their lives while serving with the UN in Cyprus.

Controversies

In 2020, Senior Constable Murphy,  an officer attached to Strike Force Raptor; a unit tasked with disrupting, dismantling and investigating OMCG activity in NSW was found 'not currently suitable for contact with the general public' after an altercation with a female driver during a vehicle stop. The officer had previously come to public notoriety after being filmed multiple times interacting with OMCG members. The officer was eventually referred to by their name / identifcation tag; Raptor 13. 

In June 2021 Friendlyjordies producer Kristo Langker was arrested by officers from the Fixated Persons Unit and charged with two counts of stalking and intimidating John Barilaro after Langker had approached Barilaro at different events. Langker's lawyer Mark Davis contested the police's accounts, and he denounced the timing of the arrest being soon after the defamation lawsuit commenced. He also criticised use of the Fixated Persons Unit, a counter-terrorism unit set up in the wake of the Lindt Cafe siege. In August 2021 it was revealed that Barilaro had been in contact with the Fixated Persons Unit regarding Shanks for at least six months prior to Langker's arrest. This contradicted what Barilaro had earlier told Sky News Australia host Tom Connell, saying that he had not requested the Fixated Persons Unit become involved in the matter.

In 2014, two former NSW Police detectives Roger Rogerson (dismissed from NSW Police in 1986 following corruption, extortion and murder allegations) and Glen Mcnamara (disengaged from NSW Police in 2012) were arrested for murder, drug dealing and other offences. The two ex detectives murdered a foreign national over a drug dispute and then dumped his body in a lake. 

In November 2022, NSW police were speaking with well known activist Danny LIM. During the incident the attending Police attempted to arrest LIM and through use of excessive force caused serious injuries requiring hospitalisation. As of December 2022 this matter is still being investigated with regards to the lawfulness of the arrest and the subsequent injuries with the officers involved suspended pending the outcome of the investigation.

Racial categories
NSW Police uses the following racial categories to describe alleged criminals, offenders, suspects, victims and missing persons (as conferred with representatives from the then Ethnic Affairs Commission, the Ethnic Communities Council of NSW and various community groups in 1999):

 Asian appearance
 Aboriginal appearance 
 Black/African appearance 
 White/European appearance
 Indian/Pakistani appearance 
 Pacific Islander appearance
 South American appearance
 Middle Eastern/Mediterranean appearance

To note, they also established policy guidelines to regulate the use of ethnicity based descriptors.

See also
 Crime in Sydney
 Crime in Australia
 Independent Commission Against Corruption
 Justice and Police Museum
 New South Wales Mounted Police
 Operations Support Group
 Public Order and Riot Squad
 State Protection Group

Former units:
 Tactical Response Group (TRG) – Former NSW Police unit.
 Special Weapons and Operations Squad (SWOS) – Former NSW Police unit.

Individuals:
 List of Commissioners of New South Wales Police
 Phillip Arantz

Other:
 Public Service Association of NSW, the Union for Administrative and Support Staff employed in NSW Police

References

External links

NSW Police website
National Police Memorial website
Union for NSW Police
Ozbadge: The Badge History of NSW Police Force
australianpolice.com.au – Unofficial site with much information about the NSW Police – formerly www.Policensw.com

 
Police Force
Emergency services in New South Wales
1862 establishments in Australia
Police stations in New South Wales
Government agencies established in 1862